Garden guns are small bore shotguns commonly used by gardeners and farmers for pest control. They are made to fire small gauges such as .410 bore, 9mm Flobert, or .22 long rifle rimfire shotshells. They are short-range shotguns that can do little harm past 15 to 20 yards, and they are relatively quiet when fired with rimfire ammunition. These guns are especially suitable for use inside barns and sheds, as the low-velocity small shot will not penetrate roofs or walls, or injure livestock with a ricochet. Such guns are also used for pest control at airports, warehouses, stockyards, etc.

.22 Rimfire
In North America, garden guns are usually chambered for .22 Rimfire and the most common cartridge is a .22 Long Rifle loaded with No. 12 shot.

Examples of smooth-bore firearms include the: Marlin Model 25MG, 
Remington Model 511SB, Winchester Model 67, and the Henry Garden Gun.

9mm Flobert

In Europe, garden guns designed for the 9mm Flobert rimfire shotshell cartridge are common, and face very little to no restriction, even in countries with strict gun laws. Its power and range are very limited, making it suitable only for pest control. Fiocchi-made 9mm Flobert rimfire ammunition uses a 1.75" brass shotshell firing 1/4 oz shot of No. 8 shot with a velocity of 600 fps.

Examples include the Chiappa Little Badger Shotgun

.410 bore
Small .410 gauge shotguns such as the Snake Charmer, Rossi Tuffy, and H&R Tamer are also commonly used by gardeners and farmers for pest control, and are sometimes called "garden guns". .410 shotguns loaded with shot shells are well-suited for small game hunting and pest control; including rabbits, squirrels, snakes, rats, birds, etc.

See also
 Derringer
 Garrucha
 Gauge (firearms)
 Louis-Nicolas Flobert
 H&R Handy-Gun
 Kit gun
 Rimfire ammunition

References

External links
Chiappa 9mm Flobert Rimfire Shotgun

.22 LR rifles
Ammunition
Pistol and rifle cartridges
Shotgun shells